Acontia guttifera is a moth of the family Erebidae. It is found in Africa, where it is known from Angola, Kenya, Malawi, Mozambique, Namibia, South Africa, Tanzania and Zimbabwe.

References

External links
"Domino (Acontia guttifera)". Natures Wold of Wonder South Africa. With images.

guttifera
Moths of Sub-Saharan Africa
Lepidoptera of Namibia
Lepidoptera of Mozambique
Lepidoptera of Angola
Lepidoptera of Tanzania
Moths described in 1874
Lepidoptera of Kenya
Lepidoptera of Malawi
Lepidoptera of South Africa